The World Figure Skating Championships is an annual figure skating competition sanctioned by the International Skating Union in which figure skaters compete for the title of World Champion.

Men's competition took place on February 23 in Vienna, Austria-Hungary. Ladies' competitions took place from February 10 to 11 in Stockholm, Sweden. Pairs' competition took place on February 10 also in Stockholm, Sweden.

Results

Men

Referee:
 Emmerich von Szent-Györgyi 

Judges:
 Eduard Engelmann 
 Ludwig Fänner 
 Jeno Minich 
 Otto Petterson 
 Dr. Piotr von Weryho

Ladies

Judges:
 Josef Fellner 
 Otto Petterson 
 Louis Magnus 
 Jeno Minich 
 Walter Jakobsson

Pairs

Judges:
 Josef Fellner 
 Jeno Minich 
 August Anderberg 
 Otto Petterson 
 Louis Magnus

Sources
 Result List provided by the ISU
 Figure Skating - World Championships

World Figure Skating Championships
World Figure Skating Championships, 1913
Figure skating in Sweden
Figure skating in Austria-Hungary
International figure skating competitions hosted by Austria-Hungary
International figure skating competitions hosted by Sweden
1913 in Austrian sport
1913 in Swedish sport
1910s in Vienna
1910s in Stockholm
Sports competitions in Vienna
International sports competitions in Stockholm
February 1913 sports events